Graffenrieda bella is a species of plant in the family Melastomataceae. It is endemic to Panama. It is threatened by habitat loss.

References

Endemic flora of Panama
bella
Near threatened plants
Taxonomy articles created by Polbot
Plants described in 1984